Geolocator may refer to:
 Light level geolocator, a lightweight electronic archival tracking device, usually used in bird migration
 Geolocation, the identification of the real-world geographic location of an object
 Geolocation software, software used to deduce the geographic location of another party
 GPS navigation device, a device typically used in cars for navigation